Diang may refer to:

Diang, Cameroon, a town and commune in Cameroon
Diang, Sierra Leone, a Chiefdom in Sierra Leone
Diang of Persia, wife of king Yazdegerd II